Bob Bigg (11 March 1911 – 1981) was an English professional footballer who played as a midfielder.

Playing career
Bigg began his career in non-league football with Redhill F.C. and in 1934, signed for Crystal Palace then playing in the Football League Third Division South. He made a scoring debut in the first game of the 1934–35 season, in an away 2–2 draw against Aldershot F.C. He scored in the next two games also and went on to make 33 League appearances that season, scoring 16 times. in 1935–36, he made 41 appearances, scoring 12 times and 28 appearances (11 goals) in 1936–37. However, Bigg missed the latter part of the 1936–37 season (from February onwards) together with the whole of the 1937–8 season, returning in December 1938, to make a further seven appearances scoring twice. At the end of the 1938–39 season Bigg moved on to Aldershot but made one appearance for Palace in Wartime League football in February 1940. He had made a total of 114 appearances for Palace in all competitions scoring 41 times.

Personal life
Bigg died in 1981 aged 69 or 70.

References

External links
Bigg at holmesdale.net

1911 births
1981 deaths
British expatriates in Egypt
English footballers
Association football midfielders
English Football League players
Redhill F.C. players
Crystal Palace F.C. players
Aldershot F.C. players